Taylor Harry Fritz was the defending champion, but is no longer eligible to compete.

Félix Auger-Aliassime won the title, defeating Miomir Kecmanović in the final, 6–3, 6–0.

Seeds

Main draw

Finals

Top half

Section 1

Section 2

Bottom half

Section 3

Section 4

Qualifying

Seeds

Qualifiers

Draw

First qualifier

Second qualifier

Third qualifier

Fourth qualifier

Fifth qualifier

Sixth qualifier

Seventh qualifier

Eighth qualifier

External links 
 Draw

Boys' Singles
US Open, 2016 Boys' Singles